Barnes Meadow is a 29.4 hectare Local Nature Reserve in Northampton. An area of 20 hectares is managed by the Wildlife Trust for Bedfordshire, Cambridgeshire and Northamptonshire.

The site includes a stretch of the River Nene, meadows and a redundant arm of the river. There are many dragonflies including brown hawkers, and a large population of grass snakes. Birds include grey herons, kingfishers and great crested grebes.

There is access from the Nene Way footpath, which passes through the site.

References

Wildlife Trust for Bedfordshire, Cambridgeshire and Northamptonshire reserves
Local Nature Reserves in Northamptonshire